Stephen P. Hubbell (born 17 February 1942) is an American ecologist on the faculty of the University of California, Los Angeles. He is author of the unified neutral theory of biodiversity and biogeography (UNTB), which seeks to explain the diversity and relative abundance of species in ecological communities not by niche differences but by stochastic processes (random walk) among ecologically equivalent species. Hubbell is also a senior staff scientist at the Smithsonian Tropical Research Institute in Balboa, Panama. He is also well known for tropical forest studies. In 1980, he and Robin B. Foster of the Field Museum in Chicago, launched the first of the 50 hectare forest dynamics studies on Barro Colorado Island in Panama. This plot became the flagship of a global network of large permanent forest dynamics plots, all following identical measurement protocols. This global network now has more than 70 plots in 28 countries, and these plots contain more than 12000 tree species and 7 million individual trees that are tagged, mapped, and monitored long-term for growth, survival and recruitment. The Center for Tropical Forest Science coordinates research across global network of plots through the Smithsonian Tropical Research Institute. The program has expanded into the temperate zone, and is now known as the Forest Global Earth Observatory Network or ForestGEO.

In 1988, while a Professor at Princeton University, he founded the Committee for the National Institutes of the Environments (CNIE), a non-profit organization in Washington, D.C. on his fellowship from the Pew Charitable Trusts. The goal of the CNIE was to promote the creation of a government agency called the National Institutes of the Environment (NIE), modeled on the National Institutes of Health. After a dozen years, the organization became the National Council for Science and the Environment, whose mission is "to improve the scientific basis of environmental decision-making."

Hubbell was born in Gainesville, Florida.  He earned his doctorate in zoology at the University of California, Berkeley, in 1969. As a professor at the University of Michigan, he taught graduate courses for the Organization for Tropical Studies in Costa Rica. Later, at Princeton University, as a professor of ecology and evolutionary biology, he continued study of the population biology of tropical trees.

In 2003, Hubbell became Distinguished Research Professor in the Department of Plant Biology at the University of Georgia.

As a Fellow at the Pew Institute for Ocean Science, Hubbell initiated the establishment of the National Council for Science and the Environment (NCSE), which works with the parties that create and use environmental knowledge to influence environmental decisions.

Hubbell is married to evolutionary ecologist Patricia Adair Gowaty, who is also a Distinguished Professor at the University of California, Los Angeles.

Education and honors

Bachelor of Arts, Biology, 1963, Carleton College
Ph.D., Zoology, 1969, University of California Berkeley, California
American Association for the Advancement of Science, Fellow, 1980
Pew Fellows Program in Conservation and the Environment, Fellow, 1990
National Council for Science and the Environment, Chair, 1991–
American Academy of Arts and Sciences, Fellow, 2003
W.S. Cooper Award, Ecological Society of America, 2006
Eminent Ecologist Award, Ecological Society of America, 2009
International Prize for Biology, 2016

Publications

References

External links
Scientific American Interview with Steve Hubbell

American ecologists
Fellows of the American Academy of Arts and Sciences
Fellows of the American Association for the Advancement of Science
University of Georgia faculty
1942 births
Living people
Carleton College alumni
University of Michigan faculty
Fellows of the Ecological Society of America
Neutral theory